Amir Abdelhamid Mohamed (born April 24, 1979) is an Egyptian footballer. He plays the goalkeeper position for the Egyptian club El-Entag El-Harby. He started his career in Al Ahly and became his first goalkeeper after Essam El-Hadary escaped to FC Sion on 21 February 2008. He proved excellence in the games he played. Thus, Egyptian commentators asks him to wait for his chance, as they see that he will be the Egyptian national goalkeeper. Amir was once considered the third goalkeeper for the national team.

Amir played 10 minutes with Al Ahly against Internacional of Brazil in the semi-final of FIFA Club World Cup 2006, and the whole 3rd place match versus Club América of Mexico.

On May 15, 2008, Amir has been chosen for the first time in the Egypt squad for the FIFA World Cup qualifiers.

References

External links

1979 births
Living people
Al Ahly SC players
Al Masry SC players
Smouha SC players
Wadi Degla SC players
El Entag El Harby SC players
Egyptian footballers
Association football goalkeepers
Egyptian Premier League players
Egypt international footballers